Tech Pacific functioned as an Asian-Pacific IT wholesale distributor with offices throughout Australia, New Zealand, Singapore, Malaysia, Thailand, India and Hong Kong.

Jim Kennedy founded Tech Pacific in Melbourne, Australia in 1985. The organisation started as a boutique distributor of information technology.

Imagineering Australia acquired a 50% shareholding in late 1986.  In 1987, Kennedy, who had returned to the US, sold his 50% shareholding to Imagineering. Tech Pacific was kept as a separate trading entity as Jodee Rich, founder of Imagineering, wanted a vehicle to exclusively distribute product lines that competed with the product lines carried by Imagineering Australia.

In 1990 First Pacific acquired Imagineering Australia and Jodee Rich left the company. At this time Imagineering Australia, Australia's largest IT distributor, experienced financial difficulties as a result of competition introduced by the entry of an American IT distributor, Micro America, under the "Micro Australia" brand. (Micro America later merged with Softsel to form Merisel.) Graham Pickles, managing director of Imagineering Australia's Tech Pacific subsidiary, was appointed as the new group managing director. With this change, Imagineering Australia and Tech Pacific merged under the Tech Pacific name.

During the early 1990s Tech Pacific transformed itself from a value-add distributor to a broadbase distributor and the business again began to grow significantly. Merisel Australia proved a worthy adversary early on; however, through good strategic planning and target-account management, Tech Pacific regained the key reseller accounts that were most profitable leaving Merisel the smaller consultancy and retail accounts.

In March 1995, Tech Pacific acquired Merisel Australia, taking the number-two distributor out of the market and creating an Asia-Pacific IT distribution powerhouse.

In the late 1990s, First Pacific sold its interests in Tech Pacific to Hagemeyer, who in turn in the early 2000s sold the business off to CVC Asia Pacific. In 2004, Tech Pacific planned to go public through an IPO. However, Ingram Micro sensing an opportunity to become a global IT distributor, acquired Tech Pacific in a transaction valued at over 700 million dollars.

On March 31, 2005, the Tech Pacific name disappeared with the completion of the merger of Tech Pacific's business into Ingram Micro throughout Asia.

Wholesalers of Australia